Red & Gold is a 1988 album by British folk rock band Fairport Convention, their sixteenth studio album since their debut in 1968. The album was released on the Rough Trade label.

The title track was written by Ralph McTell, and tells the story of the Battle of Cropredy Bridge, which occurred in 1644 during the English Civil War. The location has strong links with Fairport Convention, being the venue of their annual music festival; the story is told from the perspective of a farm worker, Will Timms, who describes "red and gold" as "royal colours", while the red itself represents the spilled blood of combatants and the gold the wheat fields in which the battle took place.

Reception

The album entered the UK album chart on 28 January 1989, spending one week at No. 74.

David Fricke, Rolling Stone's reviewer, commented on the release being on Rough Trade Records: "Britain's oldest surviving folk-rock band allied to the archetypal indie punk record label! Even for Fairport Convention, which has defied time, tide and trauma in its pursuit of the electric folk dream, that's pushing it."

Track listing
 "Set Me Up" (Dave Whetstone) – 4:23
 "The Noise Club" (Maartin Allcock) – 3:12
 "Red and Gold" (Ralph McTell) – 6:44
 "The Beggar's Song" (Traditional; arranged by Maartin Allcock) – 3:33
 "The Battle" 	(Ric Sanders) – 1:09
 "Dark Eyed Molly" (Archie Fisher) – 4:34
 "The Rose Hip" (Sanders) – 4:24
 "London River" (Rod Shearman) – 2:59
 "Summer Before the War" (Huw Williams) – 4:33
 "Open the Door Richard" (Bob Dylan) – 4:57
Bonus track on 1995 rerelease
 "Close to the Wind" (live) (Marson) – 6:09

Release history
 1988, December : New Routes RUE 002 UK LP
 1989, January : New Routes RUE CD 002 UK CD
 1989 : Rough Trade ROUGH US 63 US LP & CD
 1989 : Accord 104481 France LP & cassette/104482 CD
 1989 : Possum VPL 1–6812 Australia LP & Cassette
 1991, December : Woodworm Records WRC 018 UK Cassette & CD
 1995, November : HTD Records HTD CD 47 UK CD
 1996 : Scana STAR 2002-2 Sweden, CD
 2000, January : Transatlantic TRACD 333 UK CD (Export Only)
 2001, June : Talking Elephant TECD 014
 2002, July : Castle Music America 06076 81177-2 US CD

Personnel
Fairport Convention
 Maartin Allcock – guitars, bouzouki, mandolin, accordion, keyboards, vocals
 Ric Sanders – violin
 Dave Pegg –  acoustic & bass guitars, vocals
 Dave Mattacks – drums, percussion, keyboards, harpsichord
 Simon Nicol – guitars, vocals, dobro

Additional personnel
 Tim Matyear – engineer
 Rob Braviner & Mark Tucker – engineering
 John Dent – mastering
 Mike Dolan – mixing
 David Gleeson & Spencer Richards – artwork
 Malcolm Holmes – booklet design
 Dawn Robertson & John Woodward – cover photography

References and notes

External links

 Red and Gold at Discogs

1986 albums
Fairport Convention albums
Rough Trade Records albums